This list of University of Miami faculty includes notable University of Miami faculty, including four Nobel Prize recipients and globally-recognized academic subject experts who were or are faculty at the university. For a list of the University of Miami's most notable alumni, see: list of University of Miami alumni.

The university offers  138 undergraduate, 140 master's, and 67 doctoral degree programs across 12 schools and colleges with nearly 350 majors and programs. It is a major research university with $375 million of annual research and sponsored program expenditures, making it the 71st largest university for research in the nation. Its undergraduate academic admissions standards are the highest of any university or college in the state of Florida, and the university is Carnegie-classified as: "Doctoral Universities: Very High Research Activity."

With 16,479 faculty and staff, the University of Miami is the second largest employer in Miami-Dade County, the most populous county in Florida and seventh most populous county in the nation. The University of Miami has been regularly ranked one of the top universities in the U.S. by U.S. News & World Report, which ranks it the 55th best national university as of 2021, and other independent ranking services. The university has an endowment of $1.4 billion as of 2021.

The university's athletic teams are collectively known as the Miami Hurricanes and compete in Division I of the National Collegiate Athletic Association. Its football team has won five national championships since 1983 and its baseball team has won four national championships since 1982.

School of Architecture

College of Arts and Sciences

School of Business

School of Communication

School of Education and Human Development

College of Engineering

School of Law

School of Marine and Atmospheric Studies

School of Medicine

School of Music

School of Nursing and Health Studies
 Nilda Peragallo (Women's health)

University of Miami presidents
 Bowman Foster Ashe, 1926–1952
 Jay F. W. Pearson, 1952–1962
 Henry King Stanford, 1962–1981
 Edward T. Foote II, 1981–2001
 Donna Shalala, 2001–2015
 Julio Frenk, 2015–present

Other

See also
List of University of Miami alumni

References

Lists of people by university or college in Florida
 
Miami-related lists